Hari Krishnan is an Indian actor who works in Tamil-language films. He is known for his role in Madras (2014).

Career 
After playing a supporting role in Pa. Ranjith's Attakathi (2012) and Maryan (2013), Hari Krishnan got his breakthrough with Ranjith's Madras (2014) in which he portrayed a vagabond of unsound mind named Johnny. After the success of the film, he went on to portray supporting roles in several of Ranjith's ventures and Vada Chennai (2018). He played a notable role in Sandakozhi 2 as a clan member who escapes from being killed from Pechi (played by Varalaxmi Sarathkumar) and is under the protection of Ayya (played by Rajkiran). He is set to play the lead role in a film titled Siragu, which is directed by Kutti Revathi and also stars debutante Akshitha and an untitled film produced by Ranjith.

Filmography 
All films are in Tamil, unless otherwise noted.

Web series

Awards and nominations

References

External links 

Living people
Indian male film actors
Male actors in Tamil cinema
Year of birth missing (living people)